In enzymology, a deoxyadenosine kinase is an enzyme that catalyzes the chemical reaction

ATP + deoxyadenosine  ADP + dAMP

Thus, the two substrates of this enzyme are ATP and deoxyadenosine, whereas its two products are ADP and dAMP.

This enzyme belongs to the family of transferases, specifically those transferring phosphorus-containing groups (phosphotransferases) with an alcohol group as acceptor.  The systematic name of this enzyme class is ATP:deoxyadenosine 5'-phosphotransferase. This enzyme is also called purine-deoxyribonucleoside kinase.  This enzyme participates in purine metabolism.

Structural studies

As of late 2007, only one structure has been solved for this class of enzymes, with the PDB accession code .

References

 
 

EC 2.7.1
Enzymes of known structure